Callionymus enneactis, the mangrove dragonet or common dragonet, is a species of dragonet native to the western Pacific Ocean at depths down to .  At shallower depths it occurs in areas of mangroves, being found on coral reefs at deeper depths.  This species grows to a length of  TL.

References 

enneactis
Taxa named by Pieter Bleeker 
Fish described in 1879